Ronald Arthur Richards (11 May 1928 – 20 September 2013) was an Australian rules footballer, who played in the Victorian Football League (VFL).

Recruited from Collingwood Technical School, as was his brother Lou, Ron Richards enjoyed a productive VFL career with Collingwood.

He starred on a wing in the 1953 Grand Final defeat of Geelong, but he could also rove, and was known to be a fierce tackler in the backlines.

He left the club to captain-coach the Metropolitan League's East Hawthorn, his team won the first 32 games he coached, including the 1957 premiership.

He returned to Collingwood as coach of the under-19s in 1964. He would later coach the reserves and the seniors for two games. Richards served on the committee for many years.

Richards died following illness in 2013, aged 85.

References

External links
 
 

Australian rules footballers from Melbourne
Collingwood Football Club players
Collingwood Football Club Premiership players
Collingwood Football Club coaches
Australian people of Greek descent
1928 births
2013 deaths
One-time VFL/AFL Premiership players
People from Collingwood, Victoria